The 1995 NCAA Division I baseball season, play of college baseball in the United States organized by the National Collegiate Athletic Association (NCAA) began in the spring of 1995.  The season progressed through the regular season and concluded with the 1995 College World Series.  The College World Series, held for the forty ninth time in 1995, consisted of one team from each of eight regional competitions and was held in Omaha, Nebraska, at Johnny Rosenblatt Stadium as a double-elimination tournament.  Cal State Fullerton claimed the championship for the second time.

Realignment
6 schools (Cleveland State, UIC, Northern Illinois, Green Bay, Milwaukee, and Wright State departed the Mid-Continent Conference for the Midwestern Collegiate Conference.
Colgate departed the Patriot League to become an Independent.

Format changes
With the addition of six schools, the Midwestern Collegiate Conference divided into East and West Divisions.
The Trans America Athletic Conference dissolved its divisions.
The Patriot League also dissolved its divisions and did not host a Tournament for the 1995 season.

Conference winners
This is a partial list of conference champions from the 1995 season.  The NCAA sponsored regional competitions to determine the College World Series participants.  Each of the eight regionals consisted of six teams competing in double-elimination tournaments, with the winners advancing to Omaha.  In order to provide all conference champions with an automatic bid, 12 conference champions participated in a play-in round.  The six winners joined the other 18 conference champions with automatic bids, 24 teams earned at-large selections.

Conference standings
The following is an incomplete list of conference standings:

College World Series

The 1995 season marked the forty-ninth NCAA Baseball Tournament, which culminated with the eight team College World Series.  The College World Series was held in Omaha, Nebraska.  The eight teams played a double-elimination format, with Cal State Fullerton claiming their third championship with an 11–5 win over Southern California in the final.

Bracket

Award winners

All-America team

References